Loni Ackerman (born April 10, 1949) is an American Broadway musical theatre performer and cabaret singer.

Career
Born in New York City, she made her Broadway debut in George M! in 1968, then, in the hit Off-Broadway production of Dames at Sea. Ackerman's additional Broadway credits include another major success, The Magic Show with Doug Henning, the short-lived So Long, 174th Street, and the title role in the Los Angeles production of Evita. She was in the original cast of Starting Here, Starting Now.

She appeared in the off Broadway productions of Diamonds and The Petrified Prince.  Her last Broadway credit was Grizabella in Andrew Lloyd Webber's Cats, in which she sang the famous song "Memory". She then became inactive to raise her two sons.

In August 2011, she starred at Gateway Playhouse in Bellport, Long Island, as Norma Desmond in the musical Sunset Blvd. In 2012, Ackerman debuted her cabaret show Next To Ab-normal in NYC. In 2016, Ackerman starred in My Mother, My Sister, and Me, and in To Life in 2019.

Personal life
Ackerman is married to sound designer Steve Canyon Kennedy. They have two sons, Jack and George.

References

External links
 

1949 births
20th-century American actresses
20th-century American singers
20th-century American women singers
21st-century American actresses
21st-century American women singers
21st-century American singers
Actresses from New York City
American musical theatre actresses
Cabaret singers
Living people
Singers from New York City